Giorgi Arveladze (born July 10, 1978) is the former Georgian politician, the former member of the Cabinet of Georgia and the Ex-Minister of Economy of Georgia. He was appointed on November 20, 2006, following the resignation of his precursor Irakli Okruashvili.

Arveladze previously served as head of Administration of the President of Georgia. He has also been a member of parliament, served as the secretary general of the ruling United National Movement party, headed Georgia's Parliamentary permanent Delegation to the NATO Parliamentary Assembly, and been responsible for prison reform within the Ministry of Justice (at a time when the ministry was run by Mikheil Saakashvili

A longtime ally and deputy of president Mikhail Saakashvili, Arveladze was a central actor in the Rose Revolution of November 2003. He was put in charge of President Saakashvili's PR campaign of January 5 Georgian presidential election. The incoming Prime Minister of Georgia Lado Gurgenidze replaced Arveladze with Ekaterine Sharashidze on the position of the Minister for Economics of Georgia. Giorgi Arveladze has returned to private business.

In 2012, after dropping out of public life for a time, Arveladze moved to Ukraine with his wife, a native Ukrainian. Two years later he resurfaced once again when he emerged as a member of former Ukrainian Prime Minister Yulia Timoshenko's party "Batkivschina" after his release from prison. Timoshenko introduced his party members on the TV program "Shuster LIVE" on October 24, 2014, and named Arveladze as a representative of Georgia's reformist government.

References

1978 births
Living people
Government ministers of Georgia (country)
United National Movement (Georgia) politicians